B-Sides is an EP/compilation album of Damien Rice's b-sides from singles released from his album, O. The EP includes different takes of album tracks, such as live versions, acoustic versions, instrumental versions and a demo recording of hit single "Volcano" recorded onto Rice's cassette Walkman from 1997.

Track listing

The US release does not include the radio remix of "Cannonball".

Personnel
Damien Rice – vocals, guitar, production
Shane Fitzsimons – bass guitar
Lisa Hannigan – vocals
Vyvienne Long – cello
Tom Osander – percussion, drums

References

2004 debut EPs
Albums produced by Damien Rice
B-side compilation albums
Damien Rice albums
2004 compilation albums
Vector Recordings albums